
Gmina Dołhobyczów is a rural gmina (administrative district) in Hrubieszów County, Lublin Voivodeship, in eastern Poland, on the border with Ukraine.

Villages
Gmina Dołhobyczów contains the villages and settlements of Białystok, Chłopiatyn, Chochłów, Dłużniów, Dołhobyczów, Dołhobyczów-Kolonia, Gołębie, Honiatyn, Horodyszcze, Horoszczyce, Hulcze, Kadłubiska, Kościaszyn, Lipina, Liski, Liwcze, Majdan, Mołczany, Myców, Oszczów, Oszczów-Kolonia, Podhajczyki, Przewodów, Setniki, Siekierzyńce, Sulimów, Sulimów-Kolonia, Uśmierz, Witków, Wólka Poturzyńska, Wyżłów, Zaadamie, Żabcze, Zaręka and Żniatyn.

Neighbouring gminas
Gmina Dołhobyczów is bordered by the gminas of Mircze, Telatyn and Ulhówek. It also borders Ukraine.

References

Polish official population figures 2006

Dolhobyczow
Hrubieszów County